Jingle Island is an island  long lying  northeast of Weller Island, in the Pitt Islands of the Biscoe Islands, Antarctica. It was photographed by Hunting Aerosurveys Ltd in 1956, and mapped from these photos by the Falkland Islands Dependencies Survey. It was named by the UK Antarctic Place-Names Committee in 1959 after Alfred Jingle, a strolling actor in Charles Dickens' The Pickwick Papers.

See also 
 List of Antarctic and sub-Antarctic islands

References

Islands of the Biscoe Islands